A continuous-time quantum walk (CTQW) is a quantum walk on a given (simple) graph that is dictated by a time-varying unitary matrix that relies on the Hamiltonian of the quantum system and the adjacency matrix. The concept of a CTQW is believed to have been first considered for quantum computation by Edward Farhi and Sam Gutmann; since many classical algorithms are based on (classical) random walks, the concept of CTQWs were originally considered to see if there could be quantum analogues of these algorithms with e.g. better time-complexity than their classical counterparts. In recent times, problems such as deciding what graphs admit properties such as perfect state transfer with respect to their CTQWs have been of particular interest.

Definitions
Suppose that  is a graph on  vertices, and that .

Continuous-time quantum walks 

It is also possible to similarly define a continuous-time quantum walk on  relative to its Laplacian matrix; although, unless stated otherwise, a CTQW on a graph will mean a CTQW relative to its adjacency matrix for the remainder of this article.

Mixing matrices 

Periodic vertices 

Perfect state transfer 

If a pair of vertices on  admit perfect state transfer at time t, then  itself is said to admit perfect state transfer (at time t).

Periodic graphs 
A graph  itself is said to be periodic if there is a time  such that all of its vertices are periodic at time .

A graph is periodic if and only if its (non-zero) eigenvalues are all rational multiples of each other.

Moreover, a regular graph is periodic if and only if it is an integral graph.

Perfect state transfer

Necessary conditions 

Perfect state transfer on products of graphs 

If both  and  admit perfect state transfer at time , then their Cartesian product  admits perfect state transfer at time .

If either  or  admits perfect state transfer at time , then their disjoint union  admits perfect state transfer at time .

Perfect state transfer on walk-regular graphs 
If a walk-regular graph admits perfect state transfer, then all of its eigenvalues are integers.

If  is a graph in a homogeneous coherent algebra that admits perfect state transfer at time , such as e.g. a vertex-transitive graph or a graph in an association scheme, then all of the vertices on  admit perfect state transfer at time . Moreover, a graph  must have a perfect matching that admits perfect state transfer if it admits perfect state transfer between a pair of adjacent vertices and is a graph in a homogeneous coherent algebra.

A regular edge-transitive graph  cannot admit perfect state transfer between a pair of adjacent vertices, unless it is a disjoint union of copies of the complete graph .

The only cubic distance-regular graph that admits perfect state transfer is the cubical graph.

References

External links
Quantum Walk on arxiv.org
CTQW on Wolfram Demonstrations
Quantum walk

Quantum mechanics